This list of libraries in Brunei includes public, special and university libraries. All of the libraries are operated by departments and universities under the Government of Brunei.

External links 
 Brunei Darussalam Libraries (Malay)

 
Brunei
Brunei education-related lists
Libraries